The 1958 season was the Chicago Bears' 39th in the National Football League.  The team improved on their 5–7 record from 1957 and finished with an 8–4 record under George Halas; the owner took over again as head coach in February for the reassigned Paddy Driscoll. Halas's team improved to a respectable second place tie.

Schedule

 Saturday night (October 4)

Roster
George Blanda
QB Zeke Bratkowski
Ed Brown
J.C. Caroline
Rick Casares
Willie Galimore
Bill McColl

Game summaries

Week 1

Week 2

Standings

References

Chicago Bears
Chicago Bears seasons
Chicago Bears